The 2003 World Judo Championships were the 23rd edition of the World Judo Championships, and were held in Osaka, Japan 11–15 September 2003. On the last day of competition, team events were held, as France won the men's team event and Japan won the women's.

Medal overview

Men

Women

Medal table

Results overview

Men

60 kg
14 September – Final

66 kg
13 September – Final

73 kg
13 September – Final

81 kg
12 September – Final

90 kg
12 September – Final

100 kg
11 September – Final

+100 kg
11 September – Final

Open class
14 September – Final

Men's team
15 September – Final

Women

48 kg
14 September – Final

52 kg
13 September – Final

57 kg
13 September – Final

63 kg
12 September – Final

70 kg
12 September – Final

78 kg
11 September – Final

+78 kg
11 September – Final

Open class
14 September – Final

References

External links
 
 Competition Results – 2003 Osaka World Judo Championships (International Judo Federation)

W
World Judo Championships
World Judo Championships
World Championships 2003
J
Sports competitions in Osaka
21st century in Osaka
September 2003 sports events in Asia